"Big Sur" is the third single released by Irish band the Thrills, taken from their debut album, So Much for the City (2003). The song contains elements from the 1966 song "(Theme from) The Monkees". "Big Sur" was released on 9 June 2003 and reached number 17 on the UK Singles Chart, making it the most successful single release from the band. In their home country, the song reached number nine, giving them their second top-10 single, after "One Horse Town". Elsewhere, the song reached number 44 in Italy and number 55 in the Netherlands.

Track listings

Credits and personnel
Credits are lifted from the So Much for the City album booklet.

Studios
 Recorded between October 2002 and March 2003 at Sound Factory (Los Angeles), Strongroom Studios (London, England), and Area 51 Studios (Dublin, Ireland)
 Mixed between October 2002 and March 2003 at Quad Studios (New York City)
 Mastered at Bernie Grundman Mastering (Hollywood, California)

Personnel

 The Thrills – music, arrangement
 Conor Deasy – song, vocals, guitars
 Kevin Horan – backing vocals, pianos, organs, synthesizers
 Pádraic McMahon – backing vocals, guitars, bass
 Daniel Ryan – backing vocals, guitar, banjo, bass
 Ben Carrigan – drums, percussion

 Tony Hoffer – production, engineering
 John Paterno – engineering
 Steven Rhodes – engineering
 Michael H. Brauer – mixing
 Brian "Big Bass" Gardner – mastering

Charts

References

The Thrills songs
2003 singles
2003 songs
Songs written by Bobby Hart
Songs written by Tommy Boyce
Virgin Records singles